Best of British may refer to:
 Best of British (TV series), a British documentary series which aired 1987–1994
 The Best of British (radio), a BBC Radio 4 satirical commentary programme from 1988
 The Best of British, a 1977 album by Perry Como
 Best of British (Ian McLagan album), a 2000 album by the British keyboardist
 Best of British (magazine), a British nostalgia and heritage periodical

See also 
 The Best of British £1 Notes, a 2005 compilation album by John Lydon (Johnny Rotten)
 Britain's Best Buildings
 Britain's Best Brain
 Britain's Best Dish
 Britain's Best Drives
 Britain's Best Sitcom
 Greatest Britons